Railway Digest is a monthly magazine, published in Sydney, covering contemporary railways of Australia.

Overview
The magazine's publisher is the Australian Railway Historical Society (ARHS), NSW Division. The first issue was published in March 1963 under the name New South Wales Digest and regular publication commenced with the May 1963 edition. It was renamed in January 1983. In January 1985 it changed paper size from SRA5 to A4.

Originally an enthusiast magazine mainly focusing on reporting day-to-day workings of the New South Wales Government Railways and it successors, it was produced by volunteers using a hand-operated duplicator at the home of one of its members. In May 1993, a paid editor was appointed and the magazine's focus gradually shifted to reporting news from across Australia. It has evolved into a professional full-colour production directed at the wider community and commercially distributed to newsagents throughout Australia.

The magazine content is mainly news, with some feature articles. The other six state and territory divisions of the ARHS publish their own news magazines, while Australian Railway History is the national magazine for well-researched historical features. , it retailed for $12 per issue and had printed and digital subscriptions.

See also 
 List of railroad-related periodicals
 Rail transport periodical

Publication details

References

External links
 Official website

1963 establishments in Australia
Rail transport magazines published in Australia
Monthly magazines published in Australia
Magazines established in 1963
Magazines published in Sydney